The following is a list of awards and nominations received by Canadian-American actor Ryan Reynolds.

Awards and nominations

American Cinematheque Award

Critics' Choice Movie Awards

Critics' Choice Super Awards

Entertainment Weekly Entertainer of the Year Award

Golden Globe Awards

Gotham Awards

Goya Awards

Grammy Awards

Hollywood Walk of Fame

MTV Movie & TV Awards

Nickelodeon Kids' Choice Awards

People's Choice Awards

Producers Guild of America

San Diego Film Critics Society Awards

Saturn Awards

Teen Choice Awards

Miscellaneous awards

Notes

References

Lists of awards received by American actor
Lists of awards received by Canadian actor